The Lone Wolf may refer to: 
 
 The Lone Wolf, a 1914 novel by Louis Joseph Vance
 The Lone Wolf (character), a recurring eponymous character in Vance's novels and various film adaptations
 The Lone Wolf (1917 film), a silent film based on Vance's novel
 The Lone Wolf (1924 film)
 The Lone Wolf (TV series), a 1954 series featuring Louis Hayward

See also 
Lone Wolf (disambiguation)